The 1993 Asian Women's Handball Championship, the fourth Asian Championship, which was taking place from 18 to 24 August 1993 in Shantou, China.

Preliminary round

Group A

Group B

Placement 5th/6th

Final round

Semifinals

Bronze medal match

Gold medal match

Final standing

NB : China was probably already qualified thanks to its 8th place at the 1990 World Championship.

External links
Results

H
Asian Handball Championships
Asian
H
August 1993 sports events in Asia